Falk Hentschel is a German actor, dancer and choreographer. He is mostly involved in American productions and has had supporting roles in movies such as White House Down and Transcendence. He played superhero Hawkman, which he portrayed in the Arrowverse shows The Flash, Arrow and Legends of Tomorrow.

Early life 
Hentschel was born in Leipzig, East Germany. With his parents, Jörg and Martina, and his brother Uwe, he escaped East Germany seven months before the Berlin Wall came down. He was raised bilingually, English and German, and moved around the world all his life.

Career 
Hentschel worked in London as a professional backup dancer for artists such as Mariah Carey, Britney Spears, Paulina Rubio, Jamelia and others. Later he was hired as a choreographer and worked on many music videos and tours in Canada and Asia.

In 2003, Falk decided to stay in Los Angeles for good and pursue his dream of becoming an actor. He made his acting debut in the Emmy Award-winning show Arrested Development in 2005. Small parts in Journeyman and numerous low-budget films followed.

In 2008, Hentschel decided to create his own projects and wrote the short film Who is Bobby Domino, where he met his production partner Jesse Grace. The two of them went on to write and produce more short films, of which many entered some of the most prestigious film festivals in the world and won numerous accolades.

In 2009, Hentschel worked as a go-go dancer in the piece "Untitled (Go-Go Dancing Platform)" by the artist Felix Gonzalez-Torres in the Hammer Museum in Los Angeles.

In 2009, Falk landed his first big-budget feature film role as Bernhard the assassin, co-starring next to Tom Cruise and Cameron Diaz in Knight and Day. The following year, Falk played the role of drug addict Richard Conway on TNT’s The Closer, starring Kyra Sedgwick.

In 2011, Hentschel played opposite singer Justin Bieber in the CSI: Crime Scene Investigation episode "Targets of Obsession". He also starred in the NCIS: Los Angeles episode "Archangel".

In StreetDance 2 (2012), he played a major role as Ash, the leader of a street dance crew that performed at a championship in Paris against a rival crew called Invincible.

In 2014 Hentschel guest starred in the episode "A Fractured House" of the second season of Agents of S.H.I.E.L.D. as Hydra mercenary Marcus Scarlotti aka Whiplash.

In 2015, Hentschel portrayed the Carter Hall version of Hawkman in the 2016 show DC's Legends of Tomorrow, and also Arrow and The Flash.

Filmography

References

External links 
 

Living people
German male film actors
German male television actors
Actors from Leipzig
German emigrants to the United States
Dancers from Saxony
1982 births